Javier Germán Cruz (born 15 June 1971), known as Javi Germán, is a Spanish retired footballer who played as a midfielder. He spent the majority of his career with his hometown club Cádiz, making 226 appearances and scoring seven goals, including two goals in 38 La Liga matches.

Career

Germán was born in Cádiz, capital of the province of the same name in the autonomous community in Andalusia, and began his career with Cádiz CF. He made his La Liga debut on 2 March 1991, as Cádiz hosted Real Madrid at Estadio Ramón de Carranza. He replaced Poli for the last minute of the game as Cádiz held on for an excellent 1–0 victory. This was his only minute of football that season, but he played a bigger part in 1991–92, and helped keep Cádiz in the top flight as they beat Figueres in the relegation playoff.

The following year, Cádiz actually were relegated, and they suffered a second consecutive demotion in 1993–94. Germán stayed with the club in Segunda División B for another five and a half seasons, ultimately making over 200 appearances. The best season in this period for both player and club was 1997–98, in which they had a chance to be promoted via the playoffs, missing out to Barcelona B. He left the club in January 2000, joining fellow third tier side Ponferradina. He spent only half a season with Ponferradina before seeing out his career with one year each at Segunda División B sides Motril and Benidorm. He was relegated with Benidorm in 2001–02, and retired at the end of that season as he reached his 31st birthday.

Career statistics

1. Appearances in the 1991–92 La Liga relegation playoff
2. Appearances in the 1998 Segunda División playoffs

References

External links
 
 

1971 births
Living people
Footballers from Cádiz
Spanish footballers
Association football midfielders
La Liga players
Segunda División players
Segunda División B players
Tercera División players
Cádiz CF players
SD Ponferradina players
Motril CF players
Benidorm CF footballers